Rupert Smith (born 1943) is a retired British Army officer and author. Rupert Smith may also refer to:

Rupert Smith (novelist) (born 1960), American-born English author and journalist
Rupert Smith (American football) (1897–1959), American football and baseball player

See also
Rupert Alec-Smith (1913–1983), Englishman